The 1959 Iowa Hawkeyes football team represented the University of Iowa in the 1959 Big Ten Conference football season.

Schedule

Roster

References

Iowa
Iowa Hawkeyes football seasons
Iowa Hawkeyes football